Vladimir Grigorievich Kotin (born 28 March 1962) is a former competitive figure skater who represented the Soviet Union. He is a four-time European silver medalist (1985–88), the 1978 World Junior silver medalist, and the 1985 Soviet national champion. Kotin competed at the 1984 Winter Olympics, where he placed eighth, and at the 1988 Winter Olympics, where he placed sixth. He now works as a coach in collaboration with Elena Tchaikovskaia.

Results

References

 Skatabase: 1980s Olympics
 sportsreference

Navigation

Russian male single skaters
Soviet male single skaters
Russian figure skating coaches
Olympic figure skaters of the Soviet Union
Figure skaters at the 1984 Winter Olympics
Figure skaters at the 1988 Winter Olympics
1962 births
Living people
European Figure Skating Championships medalists
World Junior Figure Skating Championships medalists
Figure skaters from Moscow